Werner Horn was the perpetrator of the 1915 Vanceboro international bridge bombing.

Werner Horn may also refer to:
 Werner Horn (politician) (b. 1970), South African Member of Parliament
 Werner D. Horn, American politician